Debay is a surname. Notable people with the surname include:

Auguste-Hyacinthe Debay (1804–1865), French painter and sculptor
Yves Debay (1954–2013), French-Belgian journalist

See also
Deba (disambiguation)